Stanley John Squire (November 24, 1915 – 1998) was a machinist and political figure in British Columbia. He represented Alberni in the Legislative Assembly of British Columbia from 1952 to 1966 as a Co-operative Commonwealth Federation and then New Democratic Party member.

He was born in Nanaimo, British Columbia in 1915 and was educated there. In 1937, Squire married Frances Patricia Degnan. He served as an alderman for Port Alberni. Squire was defeated when he ran for reelection in 1966 and 1969. After leaving politics, he served as business agent for the International Woodworkers of America local. He died in 1998.

A bursary is awarded in his name by the Port Alberni & District Labour Council.

References 

1915 births
1998 deaths
20th-century Canadian politicians
British Columbia Co-operative Commonwealth Federation MLAs
British Columbia New Democratic Party MLAs
People from Nanaimo
International Woodworkers of America people
Trade unionists from British Columbia